The Texas A&M University Institute for Advanced Study (TIAS), located at Texas A&M University in College Station, Texas, brings world-renowned scholars to collaborate on frontier research with faculty and students at A&M, with particular focus on “rising star” faculty.  The institute cuts across all fields of study in A&M's ten colleges and Health Science Center.  The institute integrates a visiting scholar with the relevant department endeavors and with related specialists in adjoining fields.

Ten years in the making, TIAS was the brainchild of John L. Junkins, professor of aerospace engineering at Texas A&M.  His ideas for a strategy of bringing more top scholars to Texas A&M were adopted by A&M's administration in 2010, with support from the university and the Chancellor of the Texas A&M System.

The First Two Classes 
The institute's first two classes have included two Nobel Laureates, awardees of the National Medal of Science, the Wolf Prize and the Hubbell Medal for Lifetime Achievement in Literature, others who have won internationally competitive research honors, as well as members of national and international academies such as the National Academy of Engineering, National Academy of Sciences, the Academia Europaea, the Académie Nationale de Médecine and the Royal Society of Sciences.

TIAS Faculty Fellows 
Visiting scholars, or TIAS Faculty Fellows as they are called, are nominated by University Distinguished Professors or Deans.  In this way, a fit with the existing scholarship and research pursuits at A&M is ensured, as is the quality of nominees based on their notable achievements.   Once recruited, TIAS Faculty Fellows nominally visit Texas A&M for up to 12 months, but appointments can also be distributed over several years.
TIAS Faculty Fellows are provided maximum time for intellectual pursuits with A&M's faculty and students.  While they give public lectures and are invited for periodic departmental or college seminars, they have no formal teaching assignments. Their focus is research, providing concentrated periods of time for collaboration with A&M's faculty and for development of graduate students.

TIAS Graduate Fellowships 
Mentorship and development of students are important aspects of TIAS. Each TIAS Faculty Fellow is assigned two graduate students with whom to collaborate on research projects. Once a Faculty nominee has been successfully recruited to visit the institute, each college nominates two or more graduate students to be reviewed by the TIAS Director for a TIAS Graduate Fellowship.  TIAS graduate students conduct research with the TIAS Faculty Fellow under the supervision of his departmental hosts.

Faculty Hosts 
Each TIAS Faculty Fellow has faculty hosts in the nominating department to facilitate his or her visit to Texas A&M. The hosts are also frequently those whose research interests coincide with those of the Faculty Fellow and are the ones engaged in new joint research.

Funding 
TIAS was established with five years of funding from the Texas A&M University system. The institute provides financial support to the Faculty Fellows with stipends consistent with their full-time salaries, housing and travel reimbursement, and significant discretionary funding to support their research activities. TIAS’ first class of six scholars arrived during the 2012-2013 academic year, and the second class had nine scholars. The launch of the institute and the first two classes' credentials are highlighted in the institute's first annual report. The goal is to appoint 20 top scholars per year to Texas A&M.

References

External links 
 

Texas A&M University